The 2013 AFF Futsal Championship is the tenth edition of the tournament which was held in Bangkok, Thailand from 19 to 27 October 2013. Ten from twelve member nations of the ASEAN Football Federation (AFF) have entered all matches were played at the Chanchai Acadium in Bangkok Thonburi University.

Venue

Group stage 
All times are Indochina Time (ICT) – UTC+7

Group A

Group B

Knockout stage

Semi-finals

Third place play-off

Final

Winner

Goalscorers 
14 goals
  Suphawut Thueanklang

13 goals
  Kritsada Wongkaeo

10 goals
  Bambang Bayu Saptaji

9 goals
  Jirawat Sornwichian

7 goals
  Gregory Giovenali
  Jarrod Basger
  Anza Restuian Mas

6 goals
  Andri Kustiawan

5 goals
  Maziri Maidin

4 goals

  Adam Stuart Cooper
  Daniel Fogarty
  Andriansyah Agustin
  Pasilan Sevilla Floriano
  Nguyen Bao Quan
  Tran Van Vu

3 goals

  Shervin Adeli
  Tobias Seeto
  Ardy Suwardy
  Fhandy Permana
  Abu Haniffa Hasan
  Muhammad Shamsul Akmar Zamri
  Saiful Nizam Mohd Ali
  Aung Aung
  Htet Wai Lin
  Naing Ye Kyaw
  Pyae Phyo Maung
  Jovanie Simpson
  Jetsada Chudech
  Kongla Lekkla
  Nawin Rattanawongsawad
  Vu Xuan Du

2 goals

  Dean Lockhart
  Marino Musumeci
  Raymond Miller
  Wade Giovenali
  Fakhri Bangkul
  Muhammad Naqib Bin Pg. Timbang
  Nur Ali
  Renaldi
  Ahmad Fawzul Hadzir Mohamad
  Fitri
  Mohamad Ali Mahat
  Mohd Asmie Amir Zahari
  Muizuddin Mohd Haris
  Qaiser Heshaam Abdul Kadir
  Zubaidi Alwee
  Kyaw Kyaw Tun
  Kyaw Soe Moe
  Pyae Phyo Maung II
  Jose Gusmao Carvalho Vong
  Hoang Tuan Vu
  Luu Quynh Toan
  Ly Khanh Hung
  Pham Thanh Dat
  Phung Trong Luan
  Tran Hoang Vinh

1 goals

  Fernando de Moraes
  Mohamad Arif Haji Eisa
  Julinur Hafid
  Syahidansyah
  Inpan Keomanixay
  Somphone Samphaonong
  Souk Ananh Phanphendy
  Mohd Faisal Saharudin
  Mohd Khairul Effendy Mohd Bahrin
  Arnie Pasanibo
  Athirach Sittisak
  Chaiwat Jamgrajang
  Patchaya Srimanta
  Manuel Varela Pereira
  Moises de Jesus
  Nguyen Troang Thien
  Pham Thanh Tuan
  Phung Trong Luan

Owngoal 

1 owngoals
  Soulichanh Phasawaeng (for )
  Pham Thanh Tuan (for )

References

External links
 Old website (Archived)

AFF Futsal Championship
Futsal
Futsal
International futsal competitions hosted by Thailand
AFF